Cai Jun (Chinese: 蔡军; born 14 March 1971) is a Chinese weightlifter and the first female world champion in the history of the sport. In 1987 while only sixteen years of age, she won the first category at the inaugural women's World Championships in Daytona Beach, USA.

References 

 Gottfried Schödl: World Championships Seniors 1997–2007 and Statistics , p. 94

1971 births
Chinese female weightlifters
Living people
World Weightlifting Championships medalists
20th-century Chinese women
21st-century Chinese women